The discography of the rock band the Grateful Dead includes more than 200 albums, the majority of them recorded live in concert.  The band has also released more than two dozen singles and a number of videos.

The Grateful Dead formed in the San Francisco Bay Area in 1965 amid the counterculture of the 1960s.  They had many musical influences, and their music evolved to a great degree over time.  They made extensive use of improvisation, and are considered one of the originators of jam band music.  The founding members were Jerry Garcia on guitar and vocals, Bob Weir on guitar and vocals, Phil Lesh on bass and vocals, Bill Kreutzmann on drums, and Ron "Pigpen" McKernan on organ, harmonica, percussion, and vocals.  Pigpen died in 1973, but the other four remained with the band for its entire 30-year history.  Second drummer Mickey Hart was also in the band for most of that time.  Others who were band members at different times were keyboardists Tom Constanten, Keith Godchaux, Brent Mydland, Vince Welnick, and Bruce Hornsby, and vocalist Donna Jean Godchaux.

While they were together, from 1965 to 1995, the Grateful Dead released thirteen studio albums and nine contemporary live albums.  The nine live albums were recently recorded and mostly contained previously unreleased original material.  They filled the role of traditional studio albums, and were an integral part of the contemporaneous evolution of the band.  (The Dead's second album, Anthem of the Sun, was an experimental amalgam of studio and live material.)

In 1991, the band started releasing retrospective live albums, a practice that has continued to the present time.  There are several series of these albums.  The "traditional" live releases were created by remixing multitrack recordings of concerts.  A second series of live albums, from 1993 to 2005, was Dick's Picks, concert recordings selected for their musical excellence but made using stereo recordings that did not allow the different musical parts to be remixed. Another series of albums was released in 2005 and 2006 in the form of digital downloads. This was followed by a series from 2007 to 2011 called Road Trips, and then, starting in 2012, by Dave's Picks.

The Grateful Dead's video albums include some albums that were released as both audio CDs and concert DVDs, either separately or together, and some that were released only on video, as well as two theatrical films.  The band has also released several compilation albums and box sets.

Studio and contemporary live albums

Unconventionally, the Grateful Dead made the release of live albums a common occurrence throughout their career. Because many were recently recorded and included previously unreleased original material, they often filled the role of traditional studio albums. An integral part of the contemporaneous evolution of the band, such live albums are included in this section.

Compilation albums

Box sets

Retrospective live albums

Traditional releases

Dick's Picks
In the 1990s and 2000s, the Grateful Dead released numerous live concert recordings from their archives in three concurrent series.  The "From the Vault" series are remixes of multi-track recordings made at the time of the concerts.  The "View from the Vault" series are also multi-track remixes, but are released simultaneously as albums on CD and as concert performance videos on DVD.  (The first three volumes were also released on VHS videotape.)  Both of these series are included in the "Retrospective" live albums list above.

The third series of concert releases is Dick's Picks, which are based on two-track concert recordings.  Unlike multi-track recordings, two-track recordings cannot be remixed, only remastered. Therefore, the sound quality of the Dick's Picks series, while generally very good, is not quite as high as that of the other official releases of live recordings, as explained in the various "caveat emptor" notices on the CD boxes.

The Dick's Picks series, which started in 1993, was named after Grateful Dead tape vault archivist Dick Latvala. Latvala selected shows with the band's approval and oversaw the production of the albums. After Latvala's death in 1999, David Lemieux became the Dead's tape archivist and took over responsibility for producing subsequent Dick's Picks releases, as well as his own Dave's Picks series.  Latvala and Lemieux worked with recording engineer Jeffrey Norman, who was in charge of mastering the CDs. The last Dick's Pick's compilation was released in 2005.

Volume 15 and later were released in HDCD format.  This provides enhanced sound quality when played on CD players with HDCD capability, and is fully compatible with regular CD players.

Digital Download Series
In the summer of 2005 the Dead began offering download versions of both their existing live releases, and a new Internet-only series, The Grateful Dead Download Series, that was available through their own online store (which offered the albums in both 256 kbit/s mp3 files and FLAC files – a preferred audio standard for those who archive Dead and other fan-made live recordings on the Internet) and the iTunes Music Store (which offered them in their 256 kbit/s AAC format). Not surprisingly, these Internet-only albums have met with the same success as their CD-based brethren. The Download Series is no longer available for purchase on the Grateful Dead's website. However, they are still available for purchase from the iTunes Music Store as well as from Nugs.net, which offer them in FLAC, Apple Lossless Audio Codec (ALAC) and mp3 formats. Amazon also has them available in mp3 format.

Road Trips
The Road Trips series of albums is the successor to Dick's Picks.  The series started after the Grateful Dead signed a ten-year contract with Rhino Records to release the band's archival material.  The Road Trips releases are created using two-track concert recordings, but unlike Dick's Picks they each contain material from multiple concerts of a tour. The production of the CDs is supervised by vault archivist David Lemieux, with mastering by sound engineer Jeffrey Norman.  Like the later Dick's Picks, the Road Trips albums are released in HDCD format.

Dave's Picks
The Dave's Picks albums followed the Road Trips series.  They are named after Grateful Dead tape archivist David Lemieux.

Unauthorized legal releases
These albums are not bootlegs.  They were released legally, but without the band's consent or cooperation.

Videos
This section does not include the following videos which were also released as audio CDs and are listed in "Retrospective live albums" above:

 View from the Vault, Volume One
 View from the Vault, Volume Two
 View from the Vault, Volume Three
 View from the Vault, Volume Four
 The Closing of Winterland
 Truckin' Up to Buffalo
 Rocking the Cradle: Egypt 1978
 Crimson White & Indigo
 Giants Stadium: June 17, 1991

Singles

7" Singles Collection
In 2017, the Grateful Dead began offering the 27 singles released throughout the band's history on 7-inch colored vinyl, for sale exclusively on their website, dead.net. Each 7-inch vinyl features remastered audio, and packaging designed by artists for each single and B-side.

Live albums by recording date
Following is a list of Grateful Dead live albums in recording date order.  The dates listed are the principal recording dates and do not include bonus tracks or bonus discs.

Rare Cuts and Oddities 1966 (live tracks) – February–July 1966
Birth of the Dead (disc two) – July 1966
30 Trips Around the Sun – July 3, 1966 – February 21, 1995
30 Trips Around the Sun: The Definitive Live Story 1965–1995 – July 3, 1966 – February 21, 1995
So Many Roads (1965–1995) (live tracks) – July 16, 1966 – July 9, 1995
So Many Roads (1965–1995) Sampler (live tracks) – July 16, 1966 – March 30, 1994
July 29 1966, P.N.E. Garden Aud., Vancouver Canada – July 29, 1966
The Grateful Dead (50th Anniversary Deluxe Edition – disc 2) – July 29–30, 1966
Vintage Dead – Late 1966
Historic Dead – Late 1966
Fallout from the Phil Zone – September 3, 1967 – March 18, 1995
Anthem of the Sun (50th Anniversary Deluxe Edition – disc 2) – October 22, 1967
Shrine Exposition Hall, Los Angeles, CA 11/10/1967 – November 10, 1967
Anthem of the Sun (live material) – November 10, 1967 – March 31, 1968
Grayfolded – January 20, 1968 – September 13, 1993
Road Trips Volume 2 Number 2 – February 14, 1968
Dick's Picks Volume 22 – February 23–24, 1968
Grateful Dead Download Series Volume 6 – March 17, 1968
Grateful Dead Origins – August 21, 1968
Two from the Vault – August 24, 1968
Aoxomoxoa (50th Anniversary Deluxe Edition – disc 2) – January 24–26, 1969
Live/Dead – January 26 – March 2, 1969
Live at the Fillmore East 2-11-69 – February 11, 1969
Fillmore West 1969: The Complete Recordings – February 27 – March 2, 1969
Fillmore West 1969 – February 27 – March 2, 1969
Fillmore West 1969: February 27th – February 27, 1969
Fillmore West 1969: February 28th – February 28, 1969
Fillmore West 1969: March 1st – March 1, 1969
Grateful Dead Download Series Volume 12 – April 17, 1969
Dick's Picks Volume 26 – April 26–27, 1969
Road Trips Volume 4 Number 1 – May 23–24, 1969
Dave's Picks Volume 43 – November 2 and December 26, 1969
Dick's Picks Volume 16 – November 8, 1969
Dave's Picks Volume 10 – December 12, 1969
Dave's Picks Volume 6 – December 20, 1969 – February 2, 1970
Dave's Picks Volume 30 – January 2, 1970
Grateful Dead Download Series Volume 2 – January 18, 1970
Dave's Picks Volume 19 – January 23, 1970
Grateful Dead Download Series: Family Dog at the Great Highway – February 4, 1970
History of the Grateful Dead, Volume One (Bear's Choice) – February 13–14, 1970
Dick's Picks Volume 4 – February 13–14, 1970
Family Dog at the Great Highway, San Francisco, CA 4/18/70 – April 18, 1970
Dick's Picks Volume 8 – May 2, 1970
Road Trips Volume 3 Number 3 – May 15, 1970
American Beauty (50th Anniversary Deluxe Edition – disc 2 & 3) – February 18, 1971
Three from the Vault – February 19, 1971
Workingman's Dead (50th Anniversary Deluxe Edition – disc 2 & 3) – February 21, 1971
Grateful Dead – March 24 – April 29, 1971
Ladies and Gentlemen... the Grateful Dead – April 25–29, 1971
Winterland: May 30th 1971 – May 30, 1971
Grateful Dead (50th Anniversary Deluxe Edition – disc 2) – July 2, 1971
Road Trips Volume 1 Number 3 – July 31 – August 23, 1971
Dick's Picks Volume 35 – August 6–24, 1971
Dave's Picks Volume 3 – October 22, 1971
Grateful Dead Download Series Volume 3 – October 26, 1971
Dick's Picks Volume 2 – October 31, 1971
Road Trips Volume 3 Number 2 – November 15, 1971
Dave's Picks Volume 26 – November 17, 1971
Dave's Picks Volume 22 – December 6–7, 1971
Listen to the River: St. Louis '71 '72 '73 – December 9, 1971 – October 30, 1973
Fox Theatre, St. Louis, MO 12-10-71 – December 10, 1971
Dick's Picks Volume 30 – March 25 – 28, 1972
Dave's Picks Volume 14 – March 26, 1972
Europe '72 – April 7 – May 26, 1972
Europe '72: The Complete Recordings – April 7 – May 26, 1972
Europe '72 Volume 2 – April 7 – May 26, 1972
Steppin' Out with the Grateful Dead: England '72 – April 7 – May 26, 1972
Rockin' the Rhein with the Grateful Dead – April 24, 1972
Hundred Year Hall – April 26, 1972
Dark Star – May 4, 1972
Lyceum '72: The Complete Recordings – May 23 –26, 1972
Lyceum Theatre, London, England 5/26/72 – May 26, 1972
Grateful Dead Download Series Volume 10 – July 21, 1972
Dave's Picks Volume 24 – August 25, 1972
Sunshine Daydream – August 27, 1972
Dave's Picks Volume 46 – September 9, 1972
Dick's Picks Volume 23 – September 17, 1972
Dick's Picks Volume 36 – September 21, 1972
Dick's Picks Volume 11 – September 27, 1972
Light into Ashes – October 18, 1972
Dave's Picks Volume 11 – November 17, 1972
Houston, Texas 11-18-1972 – November 18, 1972
Dick's Picks Volume 28 – February 26–28, 1973
Dave's Picks Volume 32 – March 24, 1973
Dave's Picks Volume 16 – March 28, 1973
Dave's Picks Volume 21 – April 2, 1973
Postcards of the Hanging – June 10, 1973 – March 24, 1990
Pacific Northwest '73–'74: The Complete Recordings – June 22, 1973 – May 21, 1974
Pacific Northwest '73–'74: Believe It If You Need It – June 22, 1973 – May 21, 1974
Dave's Picks Volume 38 – September 8, 1973
Dick's Picks Volume 19 – October 19, 1973
Winterland 1973: The Complete Recordings – November 9–11, 1973
Dave's Picks Volume 5 – November 17, 1973
Road Trips Volume 4 Number 3 – November 21, 1973
Dick's Picks Volume 14 – November 30 – December 2, 1973
Grateful Dead Download Series Volume 8 – December 10, 1973
Dick's Picks Volume 1 – December 19, 1973
Dave's Picks Volume 42 – February 23, 1974
Dave's Picks Volume 13 – February 24, 1974
Dick's Picks Volume 24 – March 23, 1974
Dave's Picks Volume 9 – May 14, 1974
Playing in the Band, Seattle, Washington, 5/21/74 – May 21, 1974
Road Trips Volume 2 Number 3 – June 16–18, 1974
Dave's Picks Volume 34 – June 23, 1974
Dick's Picks Volume 12 – June 26–28, 1974
Dave's Picks Volume 17 – July 19, 1974
Dave's Picks Volume 2 – July 31, 1974
Dick's Picks Volume 31 – August 4–6, 1974
Dick's Picks Volume 7 – September 9–11, 1974
Steal Your Face – October 16 – 20, 1974
The Grateful Dead Movie Soundtrack – October 16–20, 1974
One From the Vault – August 13, 1975
Road Trips Volume 4 Number 5 – June 9, 1976
June 1976 – June 10 – 19, 1976
Dave's Picks Volume 28 – June 17, 1976
Grateful Dead Download Series Volume 4 – June 18, 1976
Dave's Picks Volume 18 – July 17, 1976
Dave's Picks Volume 4 – September 24, 1976
Dick's Picks Volume 20 – September 25–28, 1976
Dick's Picks Volume 33 – October 9–10, 1976
Live at the Cow Palace – December 31, 1976
Dave's Picks Volume 29 – February 26, 1977
Capitol Theatre, Passaic, NJ, 4/25/77 – April 25, 1977
Grateful Dead Download Series Volume 1 – April 30, 1977
May 1977: Get Shown the Light – May 5 – 9, 1977
Cornell 5/8/77 – May 8, 1977
Buffalo 5/9/77 – May 9, 1977
May 1977 – May 11–17, 1977
Dick's Picks Volume 29 – May 19–21, 1977
Dick's Picks Volume 3 – May 22, 1977
Dave's Picks Volume 1 – May 25, 1977
Dave's Picks Volume 41 – May 26, 1977
To Terrapin: Hartford '77 – May 28, 1977
Winterland June 1977: The Complete Recordings – June 7–9, 1977
Dick's Picks Volume 15 – September 3, 1977
Dave's Picks Volume 45 – October 1 – 2, 1977
Road Trips Volume 1 Number 2 – October 7 – 16, 1977
Dave's Picks Volume 33 – October 29, 1977
Dave's Picks Volume 12 – November 4, 1977
Dick's Picks Volume 34 – November 5, 1977
Dave's Picks Volume 25 – November 6, 1977
Dick's Picks Volume 10 – December 29, 1977
Dave's Picks Volume 23 – January 22, 1978
Dick's Picks Volume 18 – February 3–5, 1978
Dave's Picks Volume 37 – April 15, 1978
Dave's Picks Volume 15 – April 22, 1978
Dave's Picks Volume 7 – April 24, 1978
Dick's Picks Volume 25 – May 10–11, 1978
July 1978: The Complete Recordings – July 1 – 8, 1978
Red Rocks: 7/8/78 – July 8, 1978
Rocking the Cradle: Egypt 1978 – September 15 – 16, 1978
Road Trips Volume 1 Number 4 – October 21–22, 1978
The Closing of Winterland – December 31, 1978
Live at Hampton Coliseum – May 4, 1979
Road Trips Volume 1 Number 1 – October 25 – November 10, 1979
Road Trips Full Show: Spectrum 11/5/79 – November 5, 1979
Road Trips Full Show: Spectrum 11/6/79 – November 6, 1979
Dave's Picks Volume 31 – December 3, 1979
Dick's Picks Volume 5 – December 26, 1979
Road Trips Volume 3 Number 1 – December 28, 1979
Road Trips Volume 3 Number 4 – May 6–7, 1980
Go to Nassau – May 15–16, 1980
Grateful Dead Download Series Volume 7 – September 3–4, 1980
Reckoning – September 25 – October 31, 1980
Dead Set – September 25 – October 31, 1980
The Warfield, San Francisco, California, October 9 & 10, 1980 – October 9 – 10, 1980
Dave's Picks Volume 8 – November 30, 1980
Madison Square Garden, New York, NY 3/9/81 – March 9, 1981
In and Out of the Garden: Madison Square Garden '81, '82, '83 – March 9, 1981 – October 12, 1983 
Dick's Picks Volume 13 – May 6, 1981
Dave's Picks Volume 20 – December 9, 1981
Road Trips Volume 4 Number 4 – April 6, 1982
Dick's Picks Volume 32 – August 7, 1982
Dave's Picks Volume 39 – April 26, 1983
Dave's Picks Volume 27 – September 2, 1983
Dick's Picks Volume 6 – October 14, 1983
Dave's Picks Volume 35 – April 20, 1984
Dick's Picks Volume 21 – November 1, 1985
Dave's Picks Volume 36 – March 26 – 27, 1987
Dylan & the Dead – July 4–26, 1987
Giants Stadium 1987, 1989, 1991 – July 12, 1987 – June 17, 1991
View from the Vault, Volume Four – July 24–26, 1987
Grateful Dead Download Series Volume 5 – March 27, 1988
Road Trips Volume 4 Number 2 – March 31 – April 1, 1988
Infrared Roses – 1989–1990
Grateful Dead Download Series Volume 9 – April 2–3, 1989
Truckin' Up to Buffalo – July 4, 1989
Crimson White & Indigo – July 7, 1989
Robert F. Kennedy Stadium, Washington, D.C., July 12 & 13, 1989 – July 12–13, 1989
Formerly the Warlocks – October 8–9, 1989
Without a Net – October 9, 1989 – April 1, 1990
Nightfall of Diamonds – October 16, 1989
Spring 1990 (The Other One) – March 14 – April 3, 1990
Terrapin Station (Limited Edition) – March 15, 1990
Spring 1990 – March 16 – April 2, 1990
Spring 1990: So Glad You Made It – March 16 – April 2, 1990
Dozin' at the Knick – March 24 – 26, 1990
Wake Up to Find Out – March 29, 1990
View from the Vault, Volume Three – June 16, 1990
Dave's Picks Volume 44 – June 23, 1990
View from the Vault, Volume One – July 8, 1990
Dave's Picks Volume 40 – July 18 – 19, 1990
Dick's Picks Volume 9 – September 16, 1990
Road Trips Volume 2 Number 1 – September 18–20, 1990
View from the Vault, Volume Two – June 14, 1991
Saint of Circumstance – June 17, 1991
Grateful Dead Download Series Volume 11 – June 20, 1991
Dick's Picks Volume 17 – September 25, 1991
Ready or Not – June 23, 1992 – April 2, 1995
Dick's Picks Volume 27 – December 16, 1992
Road Trips Volume 2 Number 4 – May 26–27, 1993

See also
Jerry Garcia discography

References

External links
 
 Grateful Dead discography at the Grateful Dead Family Discography
 The Compleat Grateful Dead Discography
 

Discographies of American artists
Discography
Folk music discographies
Rock music group discographies